Kangbao Town is a town and the seat of Kangbao County in far northwestern Hebei province, People's Republic of China, and was formerly a part of the province of Chahar. , it has 5 residential communities and 37 villages under its administration.

See also
List of township-level divisions of Hebei

References

Township-level divisions of Hebei
Zhangjiakou